Lucas Emanuel Brochero (born 23 January 1999) is an Argentine professional footballer who plays as a winger for Arsenal de Sarandí, on loan from Boca Juniors.

Career
After spells with Sportivo Belgrano (LP) and Deportivo Atalaya, Brochero headed to Boca Juniors in January 2013; following a trial. For Boca, he notably won the Best Player award at the 2019 Blue Stars/FIFA Youth Cup after netting four goals; including two in the final against Benfica. 

In July 2020, after signing a professional contract, Brochero was loaned to fellow Primera División team Central Córdoba until the end of 2021. He was initially an unused substitute for two matches, though soon made his senior debut in the Copa de la Liga Profesional during a win away to Defensa y Justicia on 29 November 2020. Brochero scored his first career goal with Central Córdoba on 20 March 2021 during a Copa de la Liga home draw with Estudiantes.

In January 2022, Brochero was loaned out to Arsenal de Sarandí until the end of the year.

Personal life
In April 2016, Brochero starred - alongside Mario Bolatti and Juan Manuel Cavallo - in a television advert to support Bomberos Voluntarios de La Para; his hometown's local firefighters.

Career statistics
.

Honours
Boca Juniors
Blue Stars/FIFA Youth Cup: 2019
Esad Osmanovski Memorial Cup: 2019

Individual
Boca Juniors
Blue Stars/FIFA Youth Cup Best Player: 2019

Notes

References

External links

1999 births
Living people
Sportspeople from Córdoba Province, Argentina
Argentine footballers
Association football forwards
Argentine Primera División players
Boca Juniors footballers
Central Córdoba de Santiago del Estero footballers
Arsenal de Sarandí footballers